Miotso is a suburb of Accra, the capital of Ghana. Miotso can be found along the Prampram Road.

References

Populated places in the Greater Accra Region